Maurice Malleret (30 September 1931 – 3 October 2021) was a French writer, historian, musicologist, and poet. He collaborated with the magazine  and Cercle Littéraire des Écrivains Cheminots.

Biography
After his secondary studies in Montluçon, Malleret started his career with SNCF. He worked at the station in Treignat from 1948 to 1963 and subsequently conducted research for a logging company in Montluçon and Limoges from 1964 to 1969. He became a correspondent for the weekly newspaper La Vie du rail.

In 1956, Malleret became a member of the friends of the National Museum of Natural History, France and contributed to an exhibit for the Cité du Train in Mulhouse. He edited the monthly newsletter of Les Amis de Montluçon from 1995 to 2011. He served on the editorial board of Les Cahiers bourbonnais from 2004 to 2013.

Maurice Malleret died in Lavault-Sainte-Anne on 3 October 2021 at the age of 90.

Distinctions
Silver Medal of the Union Artistique et Intellectuelle des Cheminots Français (1995)
Prix Athanor of the City of Montluçon (1995)
Knight of the Ordre des Palmes académiques (2007)
Knight of the Order of Agricultural Merit (2010)

Publications
Semailles (poésies) (1978)
Le Musée de la traverse en bois (1983)
Historique de l'ancienne subdivision des bois des installations fixes (1986)
La Vigne à Lavault-Sainte-Anne, jadis et naguère (1988)
La Descente du Cher en chemin de fer, de Mérinchal (Creuse) à Vierzon (Cher) (1988)
Pour voir Montluçon d'une autre façon (1989)
Trains de rêve et rêves de train (1991)
Jean Dormoy, le forgeron du 1er mai (1994)
Montluçon, capitale du Haut Cher (1994)
Encyclopédie des auteurs du pays montluçonnais et de leurs œuvres (1440-1994) (1995)
Le patrimoine des communes de l'Allier (1999)
Pour découvrir Montluçon de la meilleure façon (2005)
Le vignoble du Theil (2016)

References

1931 births
2021 deaths
French male writers
People from Montluçon
Knights of the Order of Agricultural Merit
Chevaliers of the Ordre des Palmes Académiques